The White House Department Store and Hotel McCoy is a historic building in El Paso, Texas. It was built in 1912, and designed in the Chicago School style by architect Henry C. Trost of Trost & Trost. The store itself was co-founded in 1900 by Felix Brunschwig and three of his nephews: Myrtil, Gaston and Arthur Clobentz. In 1904, it was incorporated as Felix Brunchswig & Co.. The building was remodelled in 1946-1949 for 1 million dollars. It has been listed on the National Register of Historic Places since September 24, 1980.

References

Commercial buildings completed in 1912
Buildings and structures in El Paso, Texas
Chicago school architecture in Texas
National Register of Historic Places in El Paso County, Texas
Trost & Trost buildings